Pat Boller (born November 20, 1972) is an American ice hockey coach and executive. He is currently an assistant coach and the assistant general manager with the Hartford Wolf Pack of the American Hockey League (AHL).

Boller joined the Hartford Wolf Pack as an assistant coach in 2007. Prior to the 2012–13 season, he took on the additional responsibility as assistant general manager under Jim Schoenfeld.

References

External links
Pat Boller's profile at Eliteprospects.com

1972 births
Living people
American Hockey League coaches
American ice hockey coaches